Irish Mist is the fourth of the Nuala Anne McGrail series of mystery novels by Roman Catholic priest and author Father Andrew M. Greeley.

1999 American novels
Nuala Anne McGrail series
Novels by Andrew M. Greeley
Novels about writers
Forge Books books